Plus–minus is a sports statistic used to measure a player's impact on the game.

Plus-minus, ±, or variants may also refer to:
 Plus–minus sign (±), a symbol used in mathematics and related fields
 Plus minus method, a geophysical method to interpret seismic refraction profiles

Music
 Plus-Minus (Stockhausen), a 1963 composition by Karlheinz Stockhausen
 +/- (band), an American indietronic band formed 2001
 +/- (Buke and Gase EP) (2008)
 +- Singles 1978-80, a 2010 Joy Division compilation album
 + -, a 2015 album by Mew

See also 
 Plus and minus signs, mathematical symbols
 Radical 33, a Chinese radical with the symbol "士"
 士 (disambiguation), other uses of the symbol "士"